The Energy Networks Association (ENA) is the industry body funded by UK gas and electricity transmission and distribution licence holders.

History
ENA was formed in October 2003 from the dissolution of the Electricity Association into three separate industry bodies:
 Energy Networks Association
 Association of Electricity Producers
 Energy Retail Association

Following the demerger of the Gas Distribution Network operations of British Gas Transco, they also joined ENA.

Structure
ENA member companies are:
 National Grid
 National Grid ESO
 UK Power Networks
 Western Power Distribution
 Scottish and Southern Energy
 Northern Powergrid
 Scottish Power
 Electricity North West
 Northern Ireland Electricity
 GTC
 Cadent Gas
 SGN
 Northern Gas Networks
 Wales & West Utilities
 ESB Networks
 Northern Ireland Electricity
 Fulcrum
 Inexus

(list last updated April 2018).

Function
ENA's role is to provide a strategic focus for the energy networks sector by communicating key messages. All its work is underpinned by technical expertise—more than half the association's staff are specialist engineers. ENA's online catalogue  contains hundreds of reference documents relating to cables, contactor gear, electrical and mechanical composites, overhead transmissions and distribution lines, switchgear, engineering recommendations and other information. The association also records faults, defects and safety information on behalf of the networks industry.

See also
 Association of Electricity Producers
 Energy Retail Association
 Office of Gas and Electricity Markets

References

External links
 ENA

Energy business associations
Energy in the United Kingdom
Trade associations based in the United Kingdom
Organisations based in the London Borough of Southwark